Bad Guys 2 is a 2017 South Korean television series starring Park Joong-hoon, Joo Jin-mo, Yang Ik-june, Kim Mu-yeol and Ji Soo. It is a spin-off of the 2014 television series Bad Guys. It aired on OCN from December 16, 2017 to February 4, 2018 on Saturdays and Sundays at 22:20 (KST) time slot.

Synopsis
Following the sudden, violent and tragic end of a corruption investigation three years earlier, a group of prosecutors and police detectives, unafraid of dealing out haphazard violence and applying torture, bands with an ex-mobster and an assassin. They are determined to cross the line to take revenge, battle organized crime, and end institutional corruption in their city.

Cast

Main
 Park Joong-hoon as Woo Je-mun 
 An experienced prosecutor on a crusade, having had a colleague killed and another one crippled three years earlier. After a change in higher-up politics, he is now allowed, and willing to fight dirty to capture his targets.
 Joo Jin-mo as Heo Il-hoo 
 A widely feared, former violent mobster. After having survived an assassination attempt, he turned to an honorable life as restaurant owner at Turtle Market where his iron fist now marks the law.
 Yang Ik-june as Jang Sung-cheol
 A detective, a psychopath, a gambler, or a drug addict, nobody can tell for sure. Broken and dirty as he is, he is determined, without compromise, and fights to the last breath. 
 Kim Mu-yeol as Noh Jin-pyeong 
 A rookie prosecutor who lost his partner to a seemingly random knife attack three years earlier. Still in grief, he is summoned to join a law enforcement team which is sometimes hard to tell apart from thugs.
 Ji Soo as Han Gang-joo 
 A young man, a killer who lived his entire life as underdog, making every sacrifice to support and protect his younger sister. After an assassination attempt on his sister (meanwhile the mayor's secretary), Gang-joo joins the investigator team, both for revenge and atonement.

Supporting
 Choi Gwi-hwa as Ha Sang-mo 
 Jung Suk-won as Seo Il-kang
  as Bae Sang-do
 Joo Jin-mo as Lee Myung-deuk
  as Ban Joon-hyuk
 Park Soo-young as Shin Joo-myung
 Lee Ji-ha as Kim Kyung-im
  as Yang Pil-soon
  as Jo Young-gook
 Jang Shin-young as Kim Ae-kyung
 Jo Yeon-hee as Sung Ji-soo
 Hong Ji-yoon as Han So-yeong
 Kim Min-jae as Detective Hwang Min-gab

Production
 The series is the second collaboration between writer Han Jung-hoon and director Han Dong-hwa of 38 Revenue Collection Unit. Han Jung-hoon also wrote Bad Guys.  
 Park Sung-woong was offered the leading role but declined. 
 Uhm Tae-goo was originally cast in the role of Han Gang-joo but due to a knee injury, he was replaced by Ji Soo. 
 Kang Ha-neul was originally cast in the role of No Jin-pyeong, but due to scheduling conflicts with his military enlistment, he was replaced by Kim Mu-yeol.

Original soundtrack

Part 1

Viewership

References

External links
  
 Bad Guys 2 at Studio Dragon
 Bad Guys 2 at Urban Works Media
 

2017 South Korean television series debuts
2018 South Korean television series endings
South Korean crime television series
South Korean thriller television series
OCN television dramas
Television series by Studio Dragon
Television series by Urban Works Media
Korean-language Netflix exclusive international distribution programming